Majors is an unincorporated community in Franklin County, Texas, United States. According to the Handbook of Texas, the community had a population of 13 in 2000.

History
The community was named for J.H. Majors, who operated a bank in Mount Vernon. A post office was established at Majors in 1899 and remained in operation until 1906, with Benjamin Majors as postmaster. The community had two churches, two stores, and several scattered houses in the 1930s. Its population was 20 for the following three decades. There was a sawmill in operation on a 1985 county highway map. Its population was 13 in 2000.

Geography

Education
Majors had its own school in the 1930s. Today, the community is served by the Mount Vernon Independent School District.

References

Unincorporated communities in Franklin County, Texas
Unincorporated communities in Texas